The NFL lockout may refer to any of the lockouts or strikes in the history of the National Football League:
 The 1968 NFL strike/lockout, which lasted 12 days before the start of the 1968 season.
 The 1970 NFL strike/lockout, which lasted a few days in July 1970.
 The 1974 NFL strike, which lasted for two months before the start of the 1974 season.
 The 1982 NFL strike, which lasted for eight weeks, forced the 1982 season to be shortened to 9 games per team.
 The 1987 NFL strike, which lasted for 24 days and forced the 1987 season to be shortened to 15 games per team.
 The 2001 NFL referee lockout, which lasted until September 19 and an agreement was reached to end the 2 week lockout.
 The 2011 NFL lockout, which lasted for over five months, resulted in cancellation of Pro Football Hall of Fame Game between the Chicago Bears and St. Louis Rams, but preserved the 2011 regular season.
 The 2012 NFL referee lockout, which impacted the first few weeks of the 2012 NFL season.

See also
MLB lockout
MLS lockout
NBA lockout
NHL lockout

Lockout
Sports labor disputes in the United States
National Football League controversies